Senator Farrell may refer to:

Don Farrell (born 1954), Australian senate
Daniel F. Farrell (died 1939), New York State Senate
John H. Farrell (1919–1995), New York State Senate
Peter T. Farrell (1900–1992), New York State Senate